William George Hooper (20 February 1884 – 3 September 1952) was an English professional footballer who made over 190 appearances as an outside right in the Football League, most notably for Nottingham Forest.

Career statistics

Honours 
Nottingham Forest

 Football League Second Division: 1906–07

Southport Vulcan

 Lancashire Junior Cup: 1919–20

References

Footballers from Lewisham
English footballers
Grimsby Town F.C. players
Nottingham Forest F.C. players
Notts County F.C. players
Barrow A.F.C. players
Gillingham F.C. players
English Football League players
1884 births
1952 deaths
Association football outside forwards
Brentford F.C. wartime guest players
Southport F.C. players
Lancaster City F.C. players